JohnBob Carlos (born 1974) is an American photographer and environmental activist living and working in Florida. Active since the early 1990s. His work consists mostly of color photography of the Florida Everglades landscape, its people, and culture.

Early life
He was born in Miami, Florida to second generation Cuban parents.

Career
Carlos photographs the wildlife and landscapes of Florida. He is a contributor of the Artful Activist collective an organization of visual artists and writers based in Miami, Florida, aiming at promoting grassroots activism.

Activism
Carlos is a vocal opponent to fracking in the Everglades National Parks, and as a correspondent for ActivateNow and independent media, he was the first person to report onsite about the seismic survey area at Big Cypress National Preserve in the Everglades. Carlos was also a vocal opponent of the controversial River of Grass Greenway (ROGG) a multimillion-dollar project that proposed a 12- to 14-foot expansion of 75 miles of the Tamiami Trail (US 41) to build a bicycle path in the Everglades. The ROGG $1.6M feasibility plan was rescinded by Collier County Commissioners on February 10, 2017 and by Miami-Dade County Commissioners in April 2017. Carlos participated and documented with his photography and videos the Walk for Mother Earth (2014-2017). An annual walk lead by Betty Osceola a Miccosukee tribe member of the Panther Clan and Bobby C. Billie a spiritual leader and dozens of concerned citizens who walked from Naples to Miami to gain public awareness.

Photography exhibits
 2015 Museum of the Everglades Solo Exhibit Healing Totem: The Photography of JohnBob Carlos September–October 2015 
 2017 Fort Lauderdale Historical Society Solo Exhibit Healing Waters: The Photography of JohnBob Carlos December 2017 
 2017 Art Basel Miami LUSH Group Show at Fancy Nasty Studios  
 2017 Naples Art Association Group Show Animals Fact and Fable November 2017 
 2018 Museum of the Everglades Solo Exhibit JohnBob Carlos: Hurricane Irma Collection January 2018 
 2018 Museum of the Everglades Selected photos in Group Show at the Pauline Reeves Gallery in celebration of the 50th Anniversary of the movie Wind Across the Everglades directed by Nicholas Ray and produced by Budd Schulberg  
 2018 FATVillage (Flagler+Arts+Technology) Selected Photos included in Group Show In Close Proximity 
 2018 FIU Green Library Group Show Awaken Florida organized and curated by JohnBob Carlos with a selection of his photography and artworks by other artists April 2018 followed by a Solo Exhibit JohnBob Carlos: Florida Awaken Photography April–October 2018

References

External links 

JohnBob Carlos' website
http://archive.naplesnews.com/community/3-to-do-bless-the-fleet-ep-1279311999-331281441.html
http://www.evergladesmuseum.org/images/September2015FMENewsletter.pdf
https://www.youtube.com/channel/UCIiQSqEeoK46lv2qxM803gQ
https://indiancountrymedianetwork.com/news/environment/five-day-march-under-way-against-proposed-everglades-bike-path/
https://us.eventbu.com/city/13th-annual-marjory-stoneman-douglas-festival-friday-february-26/969922
http://www.huffingtonpost.com/entry/art-will-save-the-world-9-questions-with-melanie_us_58ed7d85e4b0145a227cb99a

1974 births
Living people
American photographers
American environmentalists
People from Miami
American people of Cuban descent